Steal the Sky is the soundtrack album for the HBO movie Steal the Sky, composed and performed by Yanni. It was released on the Rhino Entertainment label in 1999. The album peaked at #17 on Billboard's "Top New Age Albums" chart in the same year.

Track listing

Personnel
Music by Yanni. Published by Time Life Music (ASCAP). "Nowhere Man" (Lennon–McCartney) Published by SBK Blackwood Music Inc. Under license from ATV Music (MacLEN)

Production
Produced for Release by Ford A. Thaxton
Project Supervision: Julie D'Angelo
Remastering: Dan Hersch/Digiprep
Project Assistance: Alexander Alvy, Emily Cagan
Editorial Supervision: Steven Chean
Art Direction & Design: Greg Allen
Cover Photo of Yanni: Lynn Goldsmith
Cover Photo Composite & Manipulation: Greg Allen
Special Thanks: Bob Emmer, Bill Inglot, Randall D. Larson, Bob O'Neill, Glenn Whitehead & Daniel Yankelevits

(Production as described in CD liner notes.)

References

External links
Official Website
Profile at IMDb

Yanni albums
Instrumental albums
1999 soundtrack albums
Romance film soundtracks
Action film soundtracks